Memorial Roots is the eighth studio album by the German power metal band Brainstorm, released on 16 October 2009.

Track listing 
All songs written and arranged by Brainstorm, all lyrics by Andy B. Franck.

 "Forsake What I Believed" - 6:31
 "Shiver" - 3:17
 "The Conjunction of 7 Planets" - 6:34
 "Cross the Line" - 5:01
 "Nailed Down Dreams" - 5:37
 "Blood Still Stains" - 4:10
 "Ahimsa" - 4:21
 "The Final Stages of Decay" - 6:27
 "Victim" - 4:16
 "When No One Cares" - 3:19
 "Would You" - 5:11

The European limited edition digipack also includes
 "Seems to Be Perfect" - 4:22
 "Too Late to Deny" - 4:33

Personnel
Band members
 Andy B. Franck - lead and backing vocals  
 Torsten Ihlenfeld - guitars, backing vocals  
 Milan Loncaric - guitars, backing vocals   
 Antonio Ieva - bass 
 Dieter Bernert - drums

Additional musicians
Michael 'Miro' Rodenberg - keyboards, producer, engineer, mastering

Production
Sascha Paeth - producer, engineer, mixing
Simon Oberender - engineer

References 

2009 albums
Brainstorm (German band) albums
AFM Records albums

ca:Downburst